Town of Sherbrooke was a federal electoral district in Quebec, Canada, that was represented in the House of Commons of Canada from 1867 to 1925.

It was created by the British North America Act, 1867. It consisted of the Town of Sherbrooke. It was abolished in 1924 and replaced by Sherbrooke riding.

Members of Parliament

This riding elected the following Members of Parliament:

Election results

By-election: On Mr. Ives being appointed President of the Privy Council, 5 December 1892

By-election: On Mr. Ives' death, 15 July 1899

By-election: On election being declared void, 4 December 1905

See also 

 List of Canadian federal electoral districts
 Past Canadian electoral districts

External links 
 Riding history from the Library of Parliament

Former federal electoral districts of Quebec
Politics of Sherbrooke